Yolanda  Broyles-González is a Yaqui-Chicana professor, writer, and activist. Her teaching and research focus on Native American culture in addition the popular performance genres of the US-Mexico borderlands.

Early life and education
Broyles-González attended the University of Arizona for her undergraduate degree and graduated Phi Beta Kappa. She earned a doctorate from Stanford University. Using the German Academic Exchange Service she was able to do research at four German universities about popular culture, gender, oral tradition.

Academic career
Broyles-González is a professor and chair of the department of Social Transformation Studies at Kansas State University. She previously taught at University of California, Santa Barbara and University of Arizona. Her research in Germany resulted in her doctoral dissertation on the German response to Latin American literature and the reception of Argentine writer Jorge Luis Borges and Chilean poet Pablo Neruda (1979). She has also written El Teatro Campesino: Theater in the Chicano Movement (1994) which focuses on women and performance. Her third book Re-emerging Native Women of the Americas: Native Chicana Latina Women's Studies (2001) is an anthology focusing on Native American women focusing on her Yaqui heritage. Earth Wisdom: A California Chumash Woman focuses on Pilulaw Khus, which gives an insight about tribal, environmental and human rights issues  from a Native woman's perspective. Her most recent book is Lydia Mendoza’s Life in Music/La Historia de Lydia Mendoza and focuses on her as a traditional performer of tejano music. Broyles-Gonzalez's books focus on empowering women and native heritage which are central to her identity. Broyles-González is on sabbatical in the Spring 2022 semester.

In May 1996, Broyles-González filed a lawsuit against the University of California Santa Barbara and its regents that challenged the unequal payment of women and minorities within the university. The lawsuit resulted in an order for the university to pay in excess of $100,000 in damages and attorney fees. In addition, the settlement contained a court order securing permanent future protection for Broyles-González against gender, race and political discrimination within the university.

Awards 
In 1996, Broyles-González received the Lifetime Distinguished Scholar Award from the National Association for Chicana and Chicano Studies. This award recognizes her “multiple and invaluable scholarly contributions and her advocacy for the Chicana/o Studies discipline.”

References

Year of birth missing (living people)
Living people
University of California, Santa Barbara faculty
University of Arizona faculty
University of Arizona alumni
Stanford University alumni
Kansas State University faculty
Native American academics
Native American women academics
American women academics
Chicana feminists
21st-century American women